Niblett is a surname of British origin. People with that name include:

 Harry Seawell Niblett (1852–1939), Royal Navy officer
 James Niblett (Jim Niblett, born ), British civil servant
 Jason Niblett (born 1983), Australian professional racing cyclist
 Robin Niblett (born 1961), British specialist in international relations
 Scout Niblett (Emma Louise Niblett, born 1973), English singer, songwriter and multi-instrumentalist
 Stephen Niblett, English academic administrator at the University of Oxford
 Vic Niblett (1924–2004), English footballer

See also
 Niblett's Bluff, a former port on Sabine River, Louisiana, U.S.A.
 Fort Niblett, a later construction at Niblett's Bluff
 Neblett, a surname